Andrée Laberge (born 1953) is a Quebec researcher and writer.

She was born in Quebec City and earned a master's degree in social work and a PhD in epidemiology. She worked as a social worker and then as a public health researcher before turning to writing. She received the Governor General's Award for French-language fiction in 2006 for her novel La rivière du loup; it was also a finalist for the Prix Ringuet from the Académie des lettres du Québec, the Prix des libraires du Québec and the Prix des cinq continents de la francophonie.

Selected works 
 Le fin fond de l'histoire (2008)
 Le fil ténu de l'âme (2012)

References 

1953 births
Living people
Canadian novelists in French
Canadian women novelists
21st-century Canadian novelists
21st-century Canadian women writers
Writers from Quebec City
Governor General's Award-winning fiction writers